Media Design School is a private tertiary institution that provides specialist industry training in 3D animation and visual effects, game art, game programming, graphic and motion design, digital media artificial intelligence, and creative advertising. It is currently the most awarded private tertiary provider in New Zealand for digital and creative technology qualifications. In 2022, the school was also ranked as New Zealand's #1 and world's #10 Animation School by Animation Career Review, and among the top three creative media and entertainment schools in the Southern Hemisphere by The Rookies.

The school is located in central Auckland, New Zealand and was established in 1998. Its qualifications are approved by New Zealand Qualifications Authority (NZQA). It offers courses from Level 6 and 7 diplomas through to Level 8 and 9 postgraduate certificates and a Masters programme.

Game development
Media Design School is the only tertiary institute in New Zealand where students can develop for PlayStation platforms with console development kits, due to an exclusive partnership with Sony Computer Entertainment Europe. Graduates have gone on to work at a variety of game development studios, such as PikPok, Bohemia Interactive, Rainbite, Grinding Gear Games, Gameloft, EA Digital Illusions CE, RocketWerkz and CerebralFix. Ninja Kiwi, who developed the popular Bloons Tower Defense game, was also founded by a graduate of the game development course.

The joint game development department also runs an annual national initiative called Girls in Games, focused on providing experience in programming and game art for high-school aged female students based in the North Island.

In 2015, Media Design School Studios was established as the first games focused accelerator programme in a New Zealand tertiary institution.
This programme has resulted in commercial releases such as Split (Itsfine Games), Dolly (MA Studios) and Tons of Guns (Voidworks) on Valve's Steam platform.

Animation and visual effects

Media Design School was ranked one of the worlds top 10 animation schools by Animation Career Review in 2022.

Student short films and productions have received major international accolades, with titles such as Accidents, Blunders and Calamities being awarded Best Animated Film at San Diego Comic-Con's independent film festival in 2016.

Graduates from the program have been employed by Weta Digital to work on blockbuster projects such as Avatar and The Lord of the Rings, and other animation studios such as Pūkeko Pictures and Oktober.

Notable productions include:
 Accidents, Blunders and Calamities (2015) – San Diego Comic-Con International Independent Film Festival Best Animated Film 2016, Show Me Shorts People's Choice & Best Editor 2015
 Escargore (2015) – SIGGRAPH Asia Official Selection 2015, Idaho Horror Film Festival Best Animated Film 2015, Columbus International Film & Video Festival Official Selection 2015, Animago Awards Best Character 2015
 Shelved (2012)
 Funeral Home Pinatas (2012)
 Dr Grordbort Presents: The Deadliest Game (2011)
 Rotting Hill (2011) starring Anna Hutchison
 Das Tub (2011)
 First Contact (2010)
 Time for Change (2010)

Other departments
The AdSchool at Media Design School was named fourth best creative school of the decade by YoungGuns Awards, which recognises the world's hottest creative talent under the age of thirty.

Campus 
Media Design School's Wynyard Quarter campus was officially opened in 2021. Some key building features include recycled rainwater for the living wall, solar panels, and carparks with electric vehicle charging points.

In 2022, the campus was awarded a 6 Green Star NZ - Education Built v3 certified rating. The project was awarded a total of 76 points from NZGBC.

Student games

Graduate Diploma of Game Development 
 Discord
 Sklum Lord
 Dead Steel – IGF China 2010, Excellent Student Award, IGF 2011 Student Competition Entrant,
 No More Gentlemen  – IGF 2011 Student Competition Entrant 
 Guardians of Eldvery  – IGF 2011 Student Competition Entrant 
 Nightfall
 Roadblock
 Affliction – IGF Student Showcase, 2008 
 Shear Factor – Crowbar Awards 2007, Bronze Medal Winner 
 Goliath – Crowbar Awards 2006 Silver Medal Winner, IGF Student Showcase Winner 2006

Diploma of Interactive Gaming 
 Cygni
 Total Cube Domination
 Interstellar Excavation
 The Uprising
 Harvest
 Battleballs
 Loop Troops – Bronze Medal Winner, Crowbar Awards, 2009
 Oddballs – Silver Medal Winner, Crowbar Awards, 2008 
 Happy Traps – IGF Student Showcase, 2008.
 Rash

Bachelor of Software Engineering (Game Programming) 

 Sky Noon 
 Sprint Robot Championship
 Frame of Mind
 Zeitgeist
 Longhaus
 Forknights

Alumni games 

 Reverie, by Rainbite Studios
 Trigger Witch, by Rainbite Studios
 Valleys Between, by Little Lost Fox
 Bug Fables, written and directed by Jose Fernando Gracia

References

External links
 Media Design School

Vocational education in New Zealand
Video game universities
Digital media schools
Education in Auckland
Universities and colleges in New Zealand
Auckland CBD